Zainudin Amali (born 16 March 1962) is an Indonesian politician. From October 2019 to March 2023, he served as Minister of Youth and Sport in the 41st Cabinet of Indonesia.

Early Life and Education 
Zainudin born in Gorontalo in 1962 to Mohammad Amali, a local cleric, and Maryam Hala. He spent his elementary school in his village elementary school, Buhu Elementary School (now Talaga Jaya 4 State Elementary School), but later moved to Manado to house of his relative to continue study at State Junior High School No. 1 Manado and Senior High School No. 4 Manado. As his father was a popular and renowned cleric, he expected his son to follow his way to become a preacher and forced him to enroll a Religious Teacher Education Program (forerunner of now Islamic University), but Zainudin resisted and caused him to flee home near the completion of his Senior High. Eventually, with support of his relatives, his parents accepted Zainudin decision and let Zainudin to choose his higher education.

He later moved to Jakarta for continuing his study to higher education. He later enrolled to Jakarta Banking and Accountancy Academy (now Perbanas Institute), graduating in 1986. He later got his second bachelor's in economics from Swadaya School of Economics in 1992. He got his master's degree in Public Policies from Prof. Dr. Moestopo University "Beragama" in 2016. He eventually got his doctoral degree in Government Administration from Institute of Home Affairs Governance in 2019.

Activism 
During his undergraduate, he joined Muslim Students' Association and become member of its journalism wing, Islamic Student Press Institute in 1986-1987. However, he later switched to Golkar affiliated student organization, Gema Kosgoro (Union of Mutual Cooperation Multifunction Organizations, Students Movement) and later Angkatan Muda Partai Golkar (Golkar Party Young Force) in 1990s.

Businesses Career 
During he took his second bachelor's degree, he became a realtor and joined Indonesian Real Estate Association and eventually became its vice general secretary. He later joined and worked for various companies offering services in directorial and commissioner posts before eventually committed to the politics fulltime in 2001-2002.

Political Career and DPR 
As a Golkar cadre, he is quite successful and were successfully elected as congressman representing three different electoral regions, Gorontalo (2004-2009), East Java VI (Kediri, Blitar, Tulungagung, Kediri City, and Blitar City) (2014-2019), and East Java XI (Bangkalan, Sampang, Pamekasan, and Sumenep) (2019-2024). When he elected from East Java XI region, he briefly become Leader of Golkar Faction in People's Representative Council (DPR) for only one month, before recruited by Joko Widodo as the Minister of Youth and Sports in his second administration.

Tenure as Minister and Appointment as Professor 
As minister, he promoted the advance of sport development and sport policies, which were largely undeveloped prior his tenure. For his works in developing sport policies in Indonesia and promoting the rapid advancement of Indonesian sports during his tenure, State University of Semarang awarded him honorary professorship in 2022.

Personal Life 
He is married to Nadiah Alhamid, an Arab-Indonesian, and the couple has one child named Safira.

He is affiliated with Nahdlatul Ulama.

References 

Living people
1962 births
21st-century Indonesian politicians
Onward Indonesia Cabinet
Golkar politicians